Anthony Giacoppo (born 13 May 1986) is an Australian cyclist riding for Avanti IsoWhey Sports.

Major results

2011
2nd National Criterium Championships
2012
1st  National Criterium Championships
5th Tour de Taiwan
1st Stages 1 & 3
1st Stage 3 Tour de Borneo
1st Prologue Tour de Kumano
2013
1st Stage 4 Jelajah Malaysia
2014
2nd National Criterium Championships
2016
1st Prologue & Stage 3 Tour of Japan
3rd National Criterium Championships
9th Herald Sun Tour

References

1986 births
Living people
Australian male cyclists